Ardsley station is a SEPTA Regional Rail station in Ardsley, Pennsylvania. It serves the Warminster Line and is located at the intersection of Jenkintown Road and Edge Hill Road. In FY 2013, Ardsley station had a weekday average of 175 boardings and 175 alightings. The station has a parking lot with 45 spaces.

Ardsley station is the last stop inbound before Glenside station in Glenside, Pennsylvania, where it merges with the SEPTA Main Line which runs between Philadelphia and Lansdale. This station is wheelchair/ADA accessible.

Station layout
Ardsley has two low-level side platforms with a mini high-level platform.

Gallery

References

External links
SEPTA – Ardsley Station
 Station from Jenkintown Road from Google Maps Street View

SEPTA Regional Rail stations
Stations on the Warminster Line
Railway stations in Montgomery County, Pennsylvania